"Men in Love" is a 2010 song by Gossip, from their album Music for Men.

Charts

References

2010 singles
2009 songs
Columbia Records singles
Gossip (band) songs
Songs written by Beth Ditto
Songs written by Hannah Blilie
Songs written by Brace Paine